Enrique Grau (December 18, 1920 – April 1, 2004) was a Colombian artist best known for his depictions of Amerindian and Afro-Colombian figures. He was a member of the triumvirate of key Colombian artists of the 20th century which included Fernando Botero and Alejandro Obregón.

Early life 
Grau was born in Panama City, Panama, just like many of the children of his time with Colombian parents, and raised in Cartagena, Colombia. He was the son of Enrique Grau Velez and Carmen Araujo Jimenez.

Career 
A self-made artist, he was influenced by the Colombian masters Ignacio Gomez Jaramillo, Santiago Martinez Delgado and Pedro Nel Gómez. Grau studied at the Art Students League in New York City, U.S. from 1941–42, and later toured Italy, where he learned etching and fresco techniques before moving to the city of Cartagena.

He won the Salón de Artistas Colombianos in 1957 launching a well-noted career in the arts. His associations of white, black, and indigenous figures and objects such as masks, eggs, fruit, or cages brought him international fame, with exhibitions at the Guggenheim Museum in New York City and the Paris Museum of Modern Art.

Death and legacy
Grau donated 1,300 works of art (including some by other artists) to the city of Cartagena, which were used to establish the Museum of Modern Art.

Grau died of pulmonary complications at a hospital in Bogotá, Colombia, at age 83.

References

External links
Enrique Grau Foundation Website

1920 births
2004 deaths
Colombian people of Panamanian descent
Modern artists
People from Cartagena, Colombia
20th-century Colombian painters
20th-century Colombian male artists
Colombian male painters
Colombian expatriates in Panama
Colombian expatriates in the United States